Arima Line may refer to:
Shintetsu Arima Line, a line of Kobe Electric Railway in Japan
Arima Line (JGR), a line of Japanese Government Railway (discontinued in 1943)